Ravenous is a 1999 horror Western cannibal film starring Guy Pearce, Robert Carlyle, Jeffrey Jones and David Arquette. The film, which is set in 1840s California, was directed by Antonia Bird and filmed in Europe. It was not a box office success and failed to recoup much of its $12 million budget. However, despite initial reception being mixed when first released, it has since garnered a reputation as a cult film.

Ravenous had a troubled history. Issues over budget and shooting schedules were still ongoing when filming was about to start in Slovakia. After the original director Milcho Manchevski walked off the set three weeks into production, he was replaced by Bird at the suggestion of actor Robert Carlyle.  Michael Nyman and Damon Albarn composed the film's score, which generated a significant amount of interest for its quirky and inventive use of loops, instruments and musical structure.

Screenwriter Ted Griffin wrote a script that combined elements from the Donner Party and that of the real life "The Colorado Cannibal", Alfred Packer, who survived by eating five companions after becoming snowbound in the San Juan Mountains in the 1870s. However, the film's plot also serves as an overt criticism of Manifest destiny through its use of cannibalism. By turning the act into an insatiable hunger, the voracious need to eat human flesh is equated to the all-consuming pursuit of power and wealth that was inherent to the expansionist attitudes of those seeking to settle the American frontier in the 19th century.

Plot 
During the Mexican–American War, Second Lieutenant John Boyd, who is fighting in the United States Army, finds his courage failing him in battle and plays dead as his unit is massacred. His body, along with the other dead, is put in a cart and hauled behind Mexican lines. However, in a moment of bravery, Boyd seizes the chance to capture the Mexican command post. His heroism earns him a captain's promotion, but when General Slauson learns of the cowardice through which victory was achieved, he posts Boyd into exile at Fort Spencer, a remote military outpost high in the Sierra Nevada commanded by the weary but genial Colonel Hart, and staffed by a motley array of misfits: the pious Private Toffler, the drug-addicted Private Cleaves, the drunken Major Knox and the ferocious Private Reich, in addition to the Native American scout George and his sister Martha.

Shortly after Boyd joins the garrison, a frostbitten stranger named Colqhoun arrives and shares a hellish tale about how his wagon train became lost in the mountain because a Colonel Ives had promised the party a shorter route to the Pacific Ocean. Instead, he led them on a more circuitous route resulting in the party getting trapped by snow for three months. Wracked by starvation, Colqhoun and his fellow travellers were reduced to cannibalism, while he alleges that Ives resorted to murder. A rescue party is assembled to retrieve any survivors and capture Ives. George warns those who are leaving about the Wendigo myth: anyone who consumes the flesh of their enemies takes their strength but becomes a demon cursed by an insatiable hunger for more human flesh.

When the soldiers reach Ives' cave, Boyd and Reich investigate. They discover the bloody remains of five skeletons, and realise that Colqhoun is Ives and he murdered everyone. Colqhoun's plan is now to kill and eat the soldiers. Colqhoun quickly kills George, Toffler and Colonel Hart, and, after a brief struggle, Reich. Boyd escapes the massacre by jumping off a cliff but breaks his leg. He hides in a pit next to the body of Reich whom he eventually eats to stay alive.

When a delirious and severely traumatized Boyd finally limps back to the fort, he returns to find it has been reinforced by General Slauson and a detachment of cavalry. Cleaves and Martha (who were on a supply mission and had not met Colqhoun) do not believe his wild tale, while the hung-over Knox cannot recall and refuses to back Boyd up. A second expedition to the cave finds no bodies or any trace of Colqhoun. A temporary commander is assigned to the fort but to Boyd's horror, it is Colqhoun, who is now calling himself Colonel Ives again. The men still refuse to believe Boyd because Colqhoun bears no sign of the wounds inflicted on him during the fight at the cave.

Secretly, Colqhoun tells Boyd that he used to suffer from tuberculosis but when a Native scout told him the Wendigo myth, then he "just had to try" by murdering him and eating his flesh, a process that cured his disease. Colqhoun now plans to use the fort as a base to cannibalize passing travellers because, like the notion of manifest destiny, the migrants had a calling just like himself. Boyd is soon suspected of murder after Cleaves is mysteriously killed. While chained up, he watches helplessly as Knox is murdered by Colqhoun's unexpected ally: Colonel Hart, back from the dead after the massacre. Colqhoun had saved Hart by feeding him his own men in order to gain his assistance. But like Colqhoun, he is now hopelessly addicted to human flesh. Colqhoun mortally wounds Boyd, forcing him to make a choice: eat or die.

Eventually, Boyd gives in and eats a stew made from Knox. However, rather than join the two men in their conspiracy to convert General Slauson, Boyd convinces Hart to free him so he can kill Colqhoun. Hart does so, but also asks to be killed because he no longer wants to live as a cannibal. Boyd agrees to this. Boyd and Colqhoun fight, inflicting grievous wounds on each other, as their recuperative powers sustain them. Eventually, Boyd forces Colqhoun into a large bear trap that pins them both together. Colqhoun taunts Boyd by telling him that he will eat him if he dies first, but if he dies first Boyd will have to make the same choice Colqhoun made him make before; eat or die. General Slauson returns, and while his aide looks around the dilapidated fort, the general tastes the meat stew left simmering on the fire and enjoys it. Meanwhile Colqhoun continues to taunt Boyd before succumbing to his wounds, leaving Boyd struggling for life. Martha find the barn with the two men inside and opens the door seeing the deceased Colqhoun and the dying Boyd together. She closes the door with a sad half smile, and walks away. Boyd does not eat Colqhoun and dies.

Cast 

 Guy Pearce as Captain John Boyd
 Robert Carlyle as F.W. Colqhoun / Colonel Ives
 David Arquette as Private Cleaves
 Jeremy Davies as Private Toffler
 Jeffrey Jones as Colonel Hart
 John Spencer as General Slauson
 Stephen Spinella as Major Knox
 Neal McDonough as Private Reich
 Joseph Runningfox (credited as Joseph Running Fox) as George
 Sheila Tousey as Martha
 Bill Brochtrup as Lindus
 Fernando Becerril as Mexican Commander
 Gabriel Berthier as Mexican Commander
 Pedro Altamirano as Mexican Commander
 Damián Delgado as Mexican Grenadier
 Tim Van Rellim as Mr. MacCready
 Miezi Sungu as Jones
 David Heyman as Mr. Janus

Production 

The film was shot on location in the Tatra Mountains, Slovakia and Durango, Mexico. One week before production, original director Milcho Manchevski was said to have submitted new storyboards, which would have required additional two weeks of shooting. The production company, Fox 2000, eventually agreed to an additional week, with complaints that Manchevski had refused production meetings with the producers. Meanwhile, Manchevski complained Fox 2000 executive Laura Ziskin micromanaged the production by vetoing his chosen technicians and casting against his wishes.

Shooting was delayed on the first day as Manchevski and the production were still negotiating over the production budget and shooting schedule. As filming commenced, Manchevski says Ziskin sent him notes on the rushes "every day", complaining about the amount of dirt on the costumes and the number of closeups. Screenwriter Ted Griffin was at hand for "constant rewrites" during the shooting.

After three weeks of shooting, Ziskin arrived to the set with director Raja Gosnell in tow to dismiss Manchevski and place Gosnell in as a replacement. While Manchevski left the production, the cast has been said to have rejected Gosnell. Robert Carlyle then recommended Antonia Bird, his frequent collaborator and business partner, to take over.

Following ten days of negotiations, Bird arrived in Prague to helm the production. She, too, would criticize the circumstances under which the filming was to take place, describing the allocated studio space as "horrible" and the scheduling of the shoot "manipulative". She also went on to say her predecessor, Manchevski, should not be blamed for the problematic production.

Bird suggests the final theatrical cut had elements introduced without her approval, as she expressed disdain over the voiceover narration and was interested in recutting the film for the European market.

This would be the last theatrical release to feature John Spencer.

Soundtrack

Reception

Box office 
Ravenous opened on March 19, 1999, in the United States in 1,040 cinemas, accumulating $1,040,727 over its opening weekend. It finished eighteenth for the weekend. The film went on to gross $2,062,405 in North America, far less than its reported $12 million budget.

Critical reception 

On Rotten Tomatoes, the film has a 51% rating based on 65 reviews and an average rating of 6/10. The site's critical consensus reads: "Ravenous tries bringing cannibal horror into an Old West setting, ending up with an uneven blend that will fail to satisfy most fans of either genre".

Roger Ebert rated the film 3/4 stars and stated that it was "the kind of movie where you savor the texture of the filmmaking, even when the story strays into shapeless gore."

See also 
 Bone Tomahawk, a 2015 Western cannibal horror film
 Cannibal! The Musical, a 1996 black comedy musical that also tells the Packer story
 Cannibalism in popular culture

References

External links 
 
 
 
 
 

1999 films
1999 comedy films
1999 horror films
1999 thriller films
1999 Western (genre) films
1990s black comedy films
1990s comedy horror films
1990s comedy thriller films
1990s American films
1990s British films
1990s English-language films
1990s Western (genre) horror films
20th Century Fox films
American black comedy films
American comedy horror films
American comedy thriller films
American Western (genre) horror films
British black comedy films
British comedy horror films
Films about cannibalism
Films based on Native American mythology
Films directed by Antonia Bird
Films produced by David Heyman
Films scored by Michael Nyman
Films set in California
Films set in Mexico
Films set in the 1840s
Films shot in Slovakia
Films shot in the Czech Republic
Films with screenplays by Ted Griffin
Heyday Films films
Period horror films
Wendigos in popular culture